Quirine Lemoine was the defending champion, but chose not to participate.

Francesca Di Lorenzo won the title, defeating Kirsten Flipkens in the final, 7–6(7–3), 6–4.

Seeds

Draw

Finals

Top half

Bottom half

References

Main Draw

Tevlin Women's Challenger - Singles
Tevlin Women's Challenger